Auburn University (AU or Auburn) is a public land-grant research university in Auburn, Alabama, US. With more than 24,600 undergraduate students and a total enrollment of more than 30,000 with 1,330 faculty members, Auburn is the second-largest university in Alabama. It is one of the state's two public flagship universities. The university is classified among "R1: Doctoral Universities – Very High Research Activity" and its alumni include five Rhodes Scholars and five Truman Scholars.

Auburn was chartered on February 1, 1856, as East Alabama Male College, a private liberal arts school affiliated with the Methodist Episcopal Church, South. In 1872, under the Morrill Act, it became the state's first land-grant university and was renamed the Agricultural and Mechanical College of Alabama. In 1892, it became the first four-year coeducational school in Alabama, and in 1899 was renamed Alabama Polytechnic Institute (API) to reflect its changing mission. In 1960, its name was changed to Auburn University to acknowledge the varied academic programs and larger curriculum of a major university.

History

The Alabama Legislature chartered the institution as the East Alabama Male College on February 1, 1856, coming under the guidance of the Methodist Church in 1859. Its first president was Reverend William J. Sasnett, and the school opened its doors in 1859 to a student body of eighty and a faculty of ten.

Auburn's early history is inextricably linked with the Civil War and the Reconstruction-era South. Classes were held in "Old Main" until the college was closed due to the war, when most of the students and faculty left to enlist. The campus was a training ground for the Confederate Army, and "Old Main" served as a hospital for Confederate wounded.

To commemorate Auburn's contribution to the Civil War, a cannon lathe used for the manufacture of cannons for the Confederate Army and recovered from Selma, Alabama, was presented to the college in 1952 by brothers of Delta Chapter of the Alpha Phi Omega fraternity. It sits today on the lawn next to Samford Hall.

Post-Civil War
The school reopened in 1866 after the end of the Civil War, its only closure. In 1872, control of the institution was transferred from the Methodist Church to the State of Alabama for financial reasons. The Reconstruction-era Alabama government placed the school under the provisions of the Morrill Act as a land-grant institution, the first in the South to be established separately from the state university. This act provided for 240,000 acres (971 km) of Federal land to be sold to provide funds for an agricultural and mechanical school. As a result, in 1872 the school was renamed the Agricultural and Mechanical College of Alabama.

Under the act's provisions, land-grant institutions were also supposed to teach military tactics and train officers for the United States military. In the late 19th century, most students at the Agricultural and Mechanical College of Alabama were enrolled in the cadet program, learning military tactics and training to become officers. Each county in the state was allowed to nominate two cadets to attend the college free of charge.

The university's original curriculum focused on engineering and agriculture. This trend changed under the guidance of William Leroy Broun, who taught classics and sciences and believed both disciplines were important for the growth of the university and the individual. In 1892, two historic events occurred: women were admitted to the Agricultural and Mechanical College of Alabama, and football was played as a school sport. Eventually, football replaced polo as the main sport on campus. The college was renamed the Alabama Polytechnic Institute (API) in 1899, largely because of Broun's influence.

On October 1, 1918, nearly all of API's able-bodied male students 18 or older voluntarily joined the United States Army for short-lived military careers on campus. The student-soldiers numbered 878, according to API president Charles Thach, and formed the academic section of the Student Army Training Corps. The vocational section was composed of enlisted men sent to Auburn for training in radio and mechanics. The students received honorable discharges two months later following the Armistice that ended World War I. API struggled through the Great Depression, having scrapped an extensive expansion program by then-President Bradford Knapp. Faculty salaries were cut drastically, and enrollment decreased along with state appropriations to the college. By the end of the 1930s, Auburn had essentially recovered, but then faced new conditions caused by World War II.

As war approached in 1940, there was a great shortage of engineers and scientists needed for the defense industries. The U.S. Office of Education asked all American engineering schools to join in a "crash" program to produce what was often called "instant engineers". API became an early participant in an activity that eventually became Engineering, Science, and Management War Training (ESMWT). Fully funded by the government and coordinated by Auburn's Dean of Engineering, college-level courses were given in concentrated, mainly evening classes at sites across Alabama. Taken by thousands of adults – including many women – these courses were highly beneficial in filling the wartime ranks of civilian engineers, chemists, and other technical professionals. The ESMWT also benefited API by providing employment for faculty members when the student body was significantly diminished by the draft and volunteer enlistment.

During the war, API also trained U.S. military personnel on campus; between 1941 and 1945, Auburn produced over 32,000 troops for the war effort. Following the end of World War II, API, like many colleges around the country, experienced a period of massive growth caused by returning military personnel taking advantage of their GI Bill offer of free education. In the five-year period following the end of the war, enrollment at API more than doubled.

Name change to Auburn

Recognizing the school had moved beyond its agricultural and mechanical roots, it was granted university status by the Alabama Legislature in 1960 and renamed Auburn University, a name that better expressed the varied academic programs and expanded curriculum that the school had been offering for years. However, it was popularly called "Auburn" for many years before the official name change, much like the University of the South has long been popularly called "Sewanee". For example, what is now Jordan-Hare Stadium was called "Auburn Stadium" when it opened in 1939.

Civil Rights era to present
Auburn University was racially segregated prior to 1963, with only white students being admitted. Integration began in 1964 with the admittance of the first African-American student, Harold A. Franklin, who had to sue the university to gain admission to the graduate school and who was denied a degree after he completed his master's thesis; he was belatedly awarded the master's in history in 2020. The first degree granted to an African-American was in 1967. According to Auburn University's Office of Institutional Research and Assessment, African-Americans comprise 1,828 of the university's 24,864 undergraduates (7.35%)  and 49 of the 1,192 full-time faculty (4.1%) . AU has decreased its African American faculty percentage from 4.3% in 2003 to 4.1% today, since the settlement of legal challenges to the underrepresentation of African Americans in AU's faculty in 2006.

In April 2018, white supremacist Richard B. Spencer spoke at Auburn University. The college had previously canceled his speaking engagement, but Spencer sued the university and a federal judge issued an injunction that allowed him to speak.  In 2018, the university began a speaker series to promote racial diversity named Critical Conversations.

In December 2021, Auburn alumna Octavia Spencer bought food for students during finals week.

Academics

The 2020 edition of U.S. News & World Report ranks Auburn as tied for the 97th best national university overall in the U.S., tied for 40th among public universities, and 164th in "Best Value Schools".

Auburn is a charter member of the Southeastern Conference (SEC), currently composed of 13 of the largest Southern public universities in the U.S. and one private university, Vanderbilt. Among the other 12 peer public universities, Auburn was ranked fourth in the 2011 edition of U.S. News & World Report. By 2018 this had risen to $778.2 million, thanks to a $500 million "It Begins at Auburn" growth campaign began in 2005, the most successful in school history. By 2017, the university raised over $1.2 billion in the "Because This is Auburn" campaign, being the first university in Alabama to raise over $1 billion as well as the most successful fundraising campaign in school history.

Auburn University is ranked 6th most LGBTQ-unfriendly campus by The Princeton Review in its 2020 rankings of the 386 American campuses that it surveys.

Auburn's College of Architecture pioneered the nation's first interior architecture degree program; its dual degree Architecture & Interior Architecture degree was the first in the nation. Its College of Architecture, Design, and Construction pioneered the nation's first Design Build master's degree program, capitalizing on the college's Building Science program with Auburn's "Rural Studio" program where Architectural students build highly creative and ingenious homes for some of the poorest regions of Alabama. These homes and efforts have been publicized by People Magazine, Time, featured on The Oprah Winfrey Show, numerous Architectural and Construction periodicals as well. Of special mention is the School's Rural Studio program, founded by the late Samuel Mockbee.

The Samuel Ginn College of Engineering has a 134-year tradition of engineering education, consistently ranking in the nation's largest 20 engineering programs in terms of numbers of engineers graduating annually. The college has a combined enrollment of close to 4,000. In 2001, Samuel L. Ginn, a noted U.S. pioneer in wireless communication and Auburn alumnus, made a $25 million gift to the college and announced plans to spearhead an additional $150 million in support. This gave Auburn the first Bachelor of Wireless Engineering degree program in the United States. Auburn University was the first university in the Southeast to offer the bachelor of software engineering degree and the master of software engineering degree.

Auburn has historically placed much of its emphasis on the education of engineers at the undergraduate level, and in recent years has been ranked as high as the 10th largest undergraduate engineering program in the U.S. in terms of the number of undergraduate degrees awarded on annual basis. The Ginn College of Engineering is now focused on expanding the graduate programs, and was recently ranked 60th nationally university with doctoral programs in engineering by U.S. News & World Report. Last year, the college ranked 67th among all engineering programs.

Auburn's Economics Department (formerly in the College of Business, now in the College of Liberal Arts) was ranked 123rd in the world in 1999 by the Journal of Applied Econometrics. Auburn was rated ahead of such international powerhouses as INSEAD in France (141st) and the London Business School (146th). Auburn's MBA Program in the College of Business has annually been ranked by U.S. News & World Report magazine in the top ten percent of the nation's more than 750 MBA Programs. The Ludwig von Mises Institute (LvMI) offices were once located in the business department of Auburn University, and the LvMI continues to work with the university on many levels.

ROTC programs are available in three branches of service: Air Force, Army, and Navy/Marine Corps with the latter being the only one in Alabama. Over 100 officers that attended Auburn have reached flag rank (general or admiral), including one, Carl Epting Mundy Jr., who served as Commandant of the U.S. Marine Corps. Auburn is one of only seven universities in the Nuclear Enlisted Commissioning Program, and has historically been one of the top ROTC producers of Navy nuclear submarine officers.

In addition to the ROTC graduates commissioned through Auburn, two master's degree alumni from Auburn, four-star generals Hugh Shelton and Richard Myers, served as Chairman of the Joint Chiefs of Staff in the last decade. Both officers received their commissions elsewhere, and attended Auburn for an M.S. (Shelton) and M.B.A. (Myers).

Auburn has graduated six astronauts (including T.K. Mattingly of Apollo 13 fame) and one current and one former director of the Kennedy Space Center. 1972 Auburn Mechanical Engineering graduate Jim Kennedy, currently director of NASA's Kennedy Space Center, was previously deputy director of NASA's Marshall Space Flight Center (MSFC). Several hundred Auburn graduates, primarily engineers and scientists, currently work directly for NASA or NASA contractors. Hundreds of Auburn engineers worked for NASA at MSFC during the peak years of the "space race" in the 1960s, when the Saturn and Apollo moon programs were in full development.

Auburn University owns and operates the  Auburn University Regional Airport, providing flight education and fuel, maintenance, and airplane storage. The Auburn University Aviation Department is fully certified by the FAA as an Air Agency with examining authority for private, commercial, instrument, and multiengine courses. In April 2015, Auburn University received the nation's first FAA approval to operate a new Unmanned Aircraft Systems Flight School as part of the Auburn University Aviation Center. The College of Business's Department of Aviation Management and Supply Chain Management is the only program in the country to hold dual accreditation by the Association to Advance Collegiate Schools of Business (AACSB) and the Aviation Accreditation Board International (AABI). Created over 65 years ago, Auburn's flight program is also the second oldest university flight program in the United States.

The Old Rotation on campus is the oldest continuous agricultural experiment in the Southeast, and third oldest in the United States, dating from 1896. In addition, the work of Dr. David Bransby on the use of switchgrass as a biofuel was the source of its mention in the 2006 State of the Union Address.

The university recently began a Master of Real Estate Development program. one of the few in the Southeast. The program has filled a void of professional real estate education in Alabama.

Modern Healthcare ranked Auburn University's Physicians Executive M.B.A. (PEMBA) program in the College of Business ninth in the nation among all degree programs for physician executives, according to the Journal's May 2006 issue. Among M.B.A. programs tailored specifically for physicians, AU's program is ranked second.

Colleges, schools and departments
Date indicated is year of founding

 College of Agriculture, 1872
 Agricultural Communications
 Agricultural Economics and Rural Sociology
 Crop, Soil and Environmental Sciences
 Animal Sciences
 Biosystems engineering
 Entomology and Plant Pathology
 School of Fisheries, Aquaculture, and Aquatic Sciences
 Horticulture
 Poultry Science
 College of Architecture, Design and Construction, 1907
 School of Architecture, Planning, and Landscape Architecture
 McWhorter School of Building Science
 School of Industrial and Graphic Design
 Raymond J. Harbert College of Business, 1967
 School of Accountancy
 Systems and Technology
 Finance
 Management
 Marketing
 College of Education, 1915
 Curriculum and Teaching
 Educational Foundations, Leadership and Technology
 School of Kinesiology
 Special Education, Rehabilitation and Counseling
 Samuel Ginn College of Engineering, 1872
 Aerospace Engineering
 Biosystems engineering
 Chemical Engineering
 Civil Engineering
 Computer Science and Software Engineering
 Electrical and Computer Engineering
 Industrial and Systems Engineering
 Materials Engineering
 Mechanical Engineering
 Polymer and Fiber Engineering
 Wireless Engineering

 College of Forestry and Wildlife Sciences, 1984
 Graduate School, 1872
 Honors College, 1981
 College of Human Sciences, 1916
 Consumer and Design Sciences
 Human Development and Family Studies
 Nutrition, Dietetics, and Hospitality Management
 College of Liberal Arts, 1986
 Art
 School of Communication and Journalism
 Communication Disorders
 Economics
 English
 History
 Music
 Philosophy
 Political Science
 Psychology
 Sociology, Anthropology and Social Work
 Theatre
 College of Nursing, 1979
 James Harrison College of Pharmacy, 1885
 Drug Discovery and Development
 Health Outcomes Research and Policy
 Pharmacy Practice
 College of Sciences and Mathematics, 1986
 Biological Sciences
 Chemistry and Biochemistry
 Geology and Geography
 Mathematics and Statistics
 Physics
 College of Veterinary Medicine, 1907
 Anatomy, Physiology and Pharmacology
 Clinical Sciences
 Pathobiology

Campus

The Auburn campus is primarily arranged in a grid-like pattern with several distinct building groups. The northern section of the central campus (bounded by Magnolia Ave. and Thach Ave.) contains most of the College of Engineering buildings, the Lowder business building, and the older administration buildings. The middle section of the central campus (bounded by Thach Ave. and Roosevelt Dr.) contains the College of Liberal Arts (except fine arts) and the College of Education, mostly within Haley Center. The southern section of the central campus (bounded by Roosevelt Dr. and Samford Ave.) contains the most of the buildings related to the College of Science and Mathematics, as well as fine arts buildings.

Several erratic building spurts, beginning in the 1950s, have resulted in some exceptions to the subject clusters as described above. Growing interaction issues between pedestrians and vehicles led to the closure of a significant portion of Thach Avenue to vehicular traffic in 2004. A similarly sized portion of Roosevelt Drive was also closed to vehicles in 2005. In an effort to make a more appealing walkway, these two sections have been converted from asphalt to concrete. The general movement towards a pedestrian only campus is ongoing, but is often limited by the requirements for emergency and maintenance vehicular access.

The current period of ongoing construction began around the year 2000. All recently constructed buildings have used a more traditional architectural style that is similar to the style of Samford Hall, Mary Martin Hall, and the Quad dorms. The Science Center complex was completed in 2005. This complex contains chemistry labs, traditional classrooms, and a large lecture hall. A new medical clinic opened behind the Hill dorm area. Taking the place of the old medical clinic and a few other older buildings, is the Shelby Center for Engineering Technology. Phase I of the Shelby Center opened in the Spring of 2008, with regular classes being held starting with the Summer 2008 term. A new Student Center opened in 2008.

In recent years, the university has been replacing or renovating older buildings. Completed in August 2017, the Mell Classroom Building was attached to the Ralph Brown Draughon Library, offering a new flexible learning space. A brand-new 89,000 square foot building for the school of nursing was also finished in 2017; it features active learning classrooms, skill and simulation labs, and public gathering areas.  In 2019, two significant projects were finished: the Brown Kopel Engineering Student Achievement Center, which includes classrooms, student study spaces, a wind-tunnel laboratory, meeting spaces, and departmental spaces for professional development and labor relations; and the opening of a new Graduate Business Building, which includes flexible classrooms and lecture halls, student study pods, team areas, and offices for the college's MBA program.  Most recent developments include an $83 million academic classroom and laboratory complex with a seating capacity of 2,000 students in 20 adaptable classrooms and laboratories, six EASL classrooms, and five lecture halls.A new 800-seat central dining hall with reservable dining and study areas as well as retail options is also part of the complex.  Completed in August 2022, the Tony and Libba Rane Culinary Science Center combines instructional and laboratory space with operational food venues and hotel spaces in which students can obtain experiential real-world training.The new college of education building, scheduled to open in 2024 and located on the site of the former Hill dorms, is one of the projects currently under construction. This building will include collaborative classrooms, instructional laboratories, up-to-date technology, and administrative spaces for faculty and staff.   The new 265,000 square foot $200 million STEM+Ag Complex will replace older STEM-related and agricultural science facilities on the former Hill site. It will offer new space for cutting-edge wet and dry research labs, collaboration spaces, shared lab support spaces, and instructional labs for six departments. The complex is scheduled to open in 2025. The STEM + Ag complex represents Auburn's largest-ever investment in academic facilities.

Student life

Campus events 
In 2019, Auburn was ranked #1 by The Princeton Review's list of happiest students on college campuses thanks in part to its wide variety of campus activities and events.

Campus activities and events begin with orientation and training sessions for new Auburn students. Auburn offers two orientation programs, Camp War Eagle and Successfully Orienting Students. Camp War Eagle is offered to incoming freshmen and guests of incoming freshmen, helping familiarize students with the orientation to college life and Auburn. Successfully Orienting Students is designed for college students transferring into Auburn from another academic institution. First-year Auburn students also have the opportunity to participate in seminars with other first-year students and learning communities.

Other prominent campus events and activities include Welcome Week and Hey Day. Welcome Week is multi-day series of programs taking place over the first days of each semester period designed to welcome both new and returning students. Hey Day is one of Auburn's most longstanding traditions, dating back to World War II, where the entire campus community wears nametags and greet one another.

Dining 
Auburn recently finished constructing a $26 million Central Dining Hall spanning 48,000 square feet with capacity for more than 800 seats and eight different meal stations. The new Central Dining Hall opened in Fall 2021.

Outside of the Central Dining Hall, Auburn students have a wide array of dining options including other dining halls in Foy Hall and The Village residential neighborhood. Students may also visit popular restaurant chains like Chick-fil-A and Starbucks in addition to locally owned and operated food trucks at various locations across campus.

All Auburn students have access to meal plans, accessible to use at all on-campus dining locations. Students may choose to purchase plans with meal swipes for access to campus dining dollars or opt for a plan with more declining balance to use at standalone restaurants and food trucks, or a combination of both.

Campus dining utilizes the popular mobile food ordering application, Grubhub.

Auburn campus dining is engaged in sustainability practices such as minimizing food waste and reducing food packaging, and campus dining also participates in a local campus community garden for both sustainability and freshness.

Auburn is a leading institution nationally as it pertains to addressing and solving student food insecurity. All Auburn students have access to the Campus Food Pantry in the event students face food insecurity.

Housing
Auburn's initial Campus Master plan was designed by Frederick Law Olmsted, Jr. in 1929. For most of the early history of Auburn, boarding houses and barracks made up most of the student housing. Even into the 1970s, boarding houses were still available in the community. It wasn't until the Great Depression that Auburn began to construct the first buildings on campus that were residence halls in the modern sense. As the university gradually shifted away from agricultural and military instruction to more of an academic institution, more and more dorms began to replace the barracks and boarding houses.

Auburn's on-campus student housing consists of 30 residence halls in nine residential neighborhoods, housing a total of 4,800 residents. On-campus residents are served by 79 resident assistants, 13 housing ambassadors and many other graduate assistants and full-time university employees.
 The Quad is the oldest of the five housing complexes, dating to the Great Depression projects begun by the Works Progress Administration and located in Central Campus. Comprising ten buildings split into the Upper and Lower Quads, the Quad houses undergraduate students. Eight of the buildings are coed by floor, the remaining two are female-only. The Quad is located in the center of campus and primarily consists of double-occupancy rooms connected to a bathroom.
 The Hill currently consists of six and houses mostly undergraduates. There are two high-rise, 6-story dormitories (Boyd and Sasnett), and all dorms are coed with gender-separated floors. The Hill residence halls are configured similarly to The Quad, primarily consisting of double-occupancy rooms connected to a bathroom.
 The Village was constructed in 2009 and consists eight four-story buildings to accommodate 1,500 residents. Three buildings in The Village house members of Auburn's Panhellenic sororities. Most Village rooms are designed as suites with four single bedrooms, two bathrooms and a furnished common living and dining area with a kitchenette.
Cambridge Hall is a five-story residence hall at Auburn University housing 300 undergraduate students, located in close proximity to Rane Culinary Science Center currently under construction. Cambridge rooms are configured to be double occupancy rooms with open closets and a shared bathroom.
 South Donahue opened in 2013 and is a five-story residence hall located on the corner of South Donahue and West Samford, right next to the baseball stadium. Most South Donahue suites include two separate bedrooms and private bathrooms, also equipped with a shared living room and kitchenette. Each bedroom has a double-sized bed, and each suite comes fit with a mounted flat-screen TV and its own washer and dryer units.
160 Ross is a luxury apartment community designed to combine the benefits of off campus living and on-campus housing. 160 Ross rooms are configured to be four bedroom/four bathroom or two bedroom/two bathroom apartments with a wide array of amenities and benefits.

Health, wellness and recreation 
Auburn's one-of-a-kind campus recreation center features a five-story cardio tower, one-third of a mile indoor running track, basketball courts, an outdoor leisure pool, cardio and fitness zones, a rock climbing wall, weight training areas and outdoor recreation spaces. Athletic Business named the 240,000 square foot facility as one of its 2014 Facilities of Merit.

Auburn's currently has more than 20 Club Sports, open to all Auburn University students without affiliation to the NCAA. The club sport programs range from sports like basketball and volleyball to clay shooting and water skiing. Auburn also offers Intramural Sports like flag football in a team setting.

Auburn students also have access to a wide array of wellness programs, including a fully functional on-campus Medical Clinic featuring 40 exam rooms, digitized x-rays and cutting edge lab equipment. The university's Student Counseling and Psychological Services office, fully accredited by the International Association of Counseling Services (IACS) to provide health counseling, is also housed within the Medical Clinic. The Medical Clinic is also home to a student pharmacy, a women's health center, a massage therapy center and a chiropractic care center.

Student clubs and organizations 
Auburn students have the opportunity to join more than 500 student organizations, with the organizations giving members the chance to explore and develop leadership skills. Some organizations on campus housed within the university's Student Involvement office include the Student Government Association, University Program Council, Emerge Student Leadership Program, Black Student Union, International Student Organization and the Graduate Student Council. Auburn's Student Involvement office also houses a number of service organizations such as Auburn University Dance Marathon, The Big Event, Beat Bama Food Drive and more.

The Auburn Plainsman is a student-run newspaper covering Auburn University and the Auburn community. The paper is the most decorated student publication, receiving more National Pacemaker Awards, handed out by the Associated Collegiate Press, than any other student news organization. As of 2021, The Auburn Plainsman is primarily an online publication, though some special editions are still carried out in print.

Other student media organizations include Eagle Eye TV station, WEGL 91.1 FM radio, The Circle literary magazine and the Glomerata yearbook.

More than 350 students are members of the Auburn University Marching Band, the 2004 recipient of the Sudler Intercollegiate Marching Band Trophy, the most prestigious collegiate marching band award. The band features all components of a traditional marching band in addition to a majorette, dance and flag line as well as the Tiger Eyes visual ensemble.

Greek life
Auburn's total Greek population is 7,541 members, or about 33.6% of all undergraduate students, as of Fall 2020.

Auburn's Greek system was behind most of the nation's public college Greek systems with full integration, the first African-American student to be initiated into a historically white sorority happened in 2001.  Integration of Auburn's historically white fraternities took place in the 1990s. Since the early 2000s, several non-white students have been initiated into historically white Greek organizations at Auburn every year.  In 2018, an African-American student became the first person of color president of a historically white Greek organization on campus.

Interfraternity Council fraternities at Auburn are roughly divided into two separate areas: "Old Row" and "New Row". "Old Row" traditionally was made up of the fraternities whose houses were located along Magnolia Avenue on the north side of campus. "New Row" is made up of fraternities whose houses were located along Lem Morrison Drive southwest of campus. However, being an "Old Row" or "New Row" fraternity does not really depend on where the house is located but on the age of the fraternity. Therefore, there are some "Old Row" fraternities with houses on "New Row" Lem Morrison Drive because they moved there. Today's "Old Row" on and around Magnolia Avenue was once the "New Row", as the first generation of fraternity houses at Auburn were on or near College Street. Most of these houses were demolished by the end of the 1970s, and only the Phi Gamma Delta and Chi Phi fraternities remain. Some fraternity houses are not located on either "New Row" or "Old Row".  Only Auburn's historically white fraternities have traditional Greek houses.

Interfraternity Council fraternities: Alpha Epsilon Pi, Alpha Gamma Rho, Alpha Psi, Alpha Sigma Phi, Alpha Tau Omega, Beta Theta Pi, Beta Upsilon Chi, Chi Phi, Delta Chi, Delta Kappa Epsilon, Delta Tau Delta, Farmhouse, Kappa Alpha Order, Kappa Sigma, Lambda Chi Alpha, Phi Delta Theta, Phi Gamma Delta, Phi Kappa Psi, Phi Kappa Tau, Phi Sigma Kappa, Pi Kappa Alpha, Pi Kappa Phi, Sigma Chi, Sigma Nu, Sigma Pi, Sigma Tau Gamma, Tau Kappa Epsilon, and Theta Chi

There are eighteen Panhellenic Council sororities represented at Auburn University.  The Auburn Panhellenic community donates roughly $500,000 and over 60,000 hours to various philanthropies every year. Sorority recruitment is a week-long process held by the Panhellenic Council in August of every year.  Each Panhellenic Council sorority at Auburn has over 200 members. Panhellenic Council sororities are not based in traditional Greek houses like Auburn's historically white fraternities, but in The Village on campus in Magnolia Hall, Oak Hall, and Willow Hall.  Each of the three buildings house six sororities.  Each sorority has an individual "chapter" room on the first floor for meetings and a "hall" where members can live located above on the second, third, or fourth floor of the same building.  Usually, the sorority's officers and members of the sophomore class live on the "hall".

Panhellenic Council sororities: Alpha Chi Omega, Alpha Delta Pi, Alpha Gamma Delta, Alpha Omicron Pi, Alpha Xi Delta, Chi Omega, Delta Delta Delta, Delta Gamma, Delta Zeta, Gamma Phi Beta, Kappa Alpha Theta, Kappa Delta, Kappa Kappa Gamma, Pi Beta Phi, Phi Mu, Sigma Kappa, Sigma Sigma Sigma, and Zeta Tau Alpha

Although a few of Auburn's National Pan-Hellenic Council (NPHC) organizations are inactive, all nine have been established on campus:
Alpha Phi Alpha, Alpha Kappa Alpha, Kappa Alpha Psi, Omega Psi Phi, Delta Sigma Theta, Phi Beta Sigma, Zeta Phi Beta, Sigma Gamma Rho, and Iota Phi Theta.  In 2019, Auburn's Board of Trustees approved the building of a $250K NPHC Legacy Plaza on campus with the intentions of improving recruitment, representation and retention of black students at Auburn which have been on a decline since its all-time high in 2007.  When the plaza is complete in 2022, Auburn will be the second SEC school (Ole Miss the first) to have a NPHC Legacy Plaza.  None of Auburn's NPHC organizations have traditional Greek houses so the plaza will be the first architectural indication of the NPHC presence on campus.

Auburn's Multicultural Greek Council is composed of Kappa Delta Chi and Omega Delta Phi.  Both were established on campus in 2016 and have no architectural presence at Auburn.

Student services and resources 
Auburn students have access to a wide variety of resources for various needs and concerns. As it pertains to academics, students have access to college-specific academic advisors, peer tutoring study partners, supplemental instruction sessions and The Miller Writing Center. If needed, students may also request academic assistance through the Office of Accessibility to best accommodate their respective learning needs.

The Auburn Office of Inclusion and Diversity is designed to help fulfill a university's strategic planning mission of “[establishing] diversity as a core value at Auburn University." This office manages student excellence programs, education and training sessions, a cross cultural center and women's initiatives. Auburn also has an ongoing Presidential Task Force for Opportunity and Equity designed to address disparities in recruitment and retention, as well as implement campus-wide diversity, equity and inclusion training.

The Auburn Cares office assesses the needs of students in the event of a crisis, emergency or unexpected difficulty. The office guides students through such a crisis while helping connect them with appropriate resources, assistance and action plans.

The Veterans Resource Center serves all military-affiliated students at Auburn. The resource center connects student veterans with one another while providing them with additional opportunities and resources to successfully transition into the Auburn community.

Athletics

Auburn University's sports teams are known as the Tigers, and they participate in Division I-A of the NCAA and in the Western Division of the 14-member Southeastern Conference (SEC). "War Eagle" is the battle cry and greeting used by the Auburn Family (students, alumni, and fans). Auburn has won a total of 21 intercollegiate national championships (including 17 NCAA Championships), which includes two football (1957, 2010), eight men's swimming and diving (1997, 1999, 2003, 2004, 2005, 2006, 2007, 2009), five women's swimming and diving (2002, 2003, 2004, 2006, 2007), five equestrian (2008, 2011,2013, 2016, 2018), and one women's outdoor track and field (2006). Auburn has also won a total of 70 Southeastern Conference championships, including 51 men's titles and 19 women's titles. Auburn's colors of orange and blue were chosen by Dr. George Petrie, Auburn's first football coach, based on those of his alma mater, the University of Virginia.

Football
 

Auburn named Hugh Freeze as the new football head coach in November 2022. Past coaches include George Petrie, John Heisman, Mike Donahue, Jack Meagher, Ralph "Shug" Jordan, Pat Dye, Terry Bowden, Tommy Tuberville, Gene Chizik, and Gus Malzahn.

Auburn played its first game in 1892 against the University of Georgia at Piedmont Park in Atlanta, starting what is currently the oldest college football rivalry in the Deep South. Auburn's first perfect season came in 1913, when the Tigers went 8–0, claiming a second SIAA conference championship and the first national championship in school history. The Tigers' first bowl appearance was in 1937 in the sixth Bacardi Bowl played in Havana, Cuba. AU football has won twelve SEC Conference Championships, and since the division of the conference in 1992, eight western division championships and six trips to the SEC Championship game. Auburn plays arch-rival Alabama each year in a game known as the Iron Bowl.

In 1957, Auburn was coached by "Shug" Jordan to a 10–0 record and was awarded the AP National Championship. Ohio State University was first in the UPI coaches' poll. Auburn was ineligible for a bowl game, however, having been placed on probation by the Southeastern Conference.

Three Auburn players, Pat Sullivan in 1971, Bo Jackson in 1985, and Cam Newton in 2010, have won the Heisman Trophy. The Trophy's namesake, John Heisman, coached at Auburn from 1895 until 1899. Auburn is the only school where Heisman coached (among others, Georgia Tech and Clemson) that has produced multiple Heisman Trophy winners. Auburn's Jordan–Hare Stadium has a capacity of 87,451 ranking as the ninth-largest on-campus stadium in the NCAA .

Auburn went 11–0 under Terry Bowden in 1993, but was on probation and not allowed to play in the SEC Championship game. Auburn completed the 2004 football season with a 13–0 record winning the SEC championship, the school's first conference title since 1989 and the first outright title since 1987. The 2004 team was led by quarterback Jason Campbell, running backs Carnell Williams and Ronnie Brown, and cornerback Carlos Rogers, all subsequently drafted in the first round of the 2005 NFL Draft. The team's new offensive coordinator, Al Borges, led the team to use the west coast style offense which maximized the use of both star running backs. However, the Tigers were ranked behind two other undefeated teams, Southern California and Oklahoma, that played in the BCS championship game.

Prior to the 2008 season, Tony Franklin was hired as offensive coordinator to put Auburn into the spread offense. He was fired, however, following the sixth game of the season that ended in a loss to Vanderbilt. Tommy Tuberville then resigned as head coach after the season. On December 13, 2008, it was reported that Gene Chizik had been hired as Auburn's new head coach. Coach Gene Chizik then hired Gus Malzahn as the Tigers' new Offensive Coordinator.

In 2010, Auburn defeated Oregon 22–19 in the 2011 BCS National Championship Game to secure the school's second national championship. The Tigers finished the season with a 14–0 record, including comeback wins over Clemson, South Carolina, Georgia, and Alabama. The Tigers trailed the Tide 24–0 in Tuscaloosa, but managed a 28–27 comeback victory in the 75th edition of the Iron Bowl. Auburn would again defeat South Carolina 56–17 in the 2010 SEC Championship Game, claiming the school's eleventh conference championship. The Tigers were led by head coach Gene Chizik, offensive coordinator Gus Malzahn, quarterback and Heisman Trophy winner Cam Newton, and defensive tackle and Lombardi Award winner Nick Fairley. In Malzahn's first season as head coach (2013), Auburn had two miraculous finishes in the final minute against Georgia and Alabama to win the SEC West. They went on to win the 2013 SEC Championship Game over Missouri and fell short in the 2014 BCS National Championship Game to the Florida State Seminoles 34–31 in Pasadena, California.

In addition to the 1913, 1957, and 2010 championships, Auburn's 1914, 1958, 1983, 1993, and 2004 teams have also been recognized as national champions by various ranking organizations.

Swimming and diving

In the last decade under head coaches David Marsh, Richard Quick and co-head coach Brett Hawke, Auburn's swimming and diving program has become preeminent in the SEC and nationally, with consecutive NCAA championships for both the men and women in 2003 and 2004, then again in 2006 and 2007. Since 1982, only eight teams have claimed national championships in women's swimming and diving. Auburn and Georgia each won nine straight (five Auburn, four Georgia) between 1999 and 2007. The men won their fifth consecutive national title in 2007, and the women also won the national title, in their case for the second straight year. The Auburn women have now won five national championships in the last six years. , the Auburn men have won the SEC Championship fifteen out of the last sixteen years, including the last thirteen in a row, and also won eight NCAA national championships (1997, 1999, 2003, 2004, 2005, 2006, 2007 and 2009). AU swimmers have represented the U.S. and several other countries in recent Olympic Games. Auburn's most famous swimmer is Olympic gold medalist Rowdy Gaines, and also Brazilian César Cielo Filho, bronze(100m freestyle) and gold medal(50m freestyle) at the 2008 Beijing Olympic Games. As the most successful female Olympic swimmer Kirsty Coventry (swimming for her home country of Zimbabwe) who won gold, silver, and bronze medals at the 2004 Summer Olympics in Athens. While the football team is far more well known nationally and in the media, Auburn swimming and diving is the most dominant athletics program for the university.

Men's basketball

The Auburn men's basketball team has enjoyed off-and-on success over the years. Its best known player is Charles Barkley. Other professional basketball players from Auburn are John Mengelt, Rex Fredicks, Eddie Johnson, Mike Mitchell, Chuck Person, Chris Morris, Wesley Person, Chris Porter, Mamadou N'diaye, Jamison Brewer, Moochie Norris, Marquis Daniels, and Pat Burke. In 2017-18 they shared the SEC Regular Season title with Tennessee and made it to the second round of the NCAA Tourney before losing to Clemson. In 2018–2019, Auburn won the SEC Tournament championship and advanced to the Final Four.

Women's basketball

The Auburn University women's basketball team has been consistently competitive both nationally and within the SEC. Despite playing in the same conference as perennial powerhouse Tennessee and other competitive programs such as LSU, Georgia, and Vanderbilt, Auburn has won four regular season SEC championships and four SEC Tournament championships. AU has made sixteen appearances in the NCAA women's basketball tournament and only once, in their first appearance in 1982, have the Tigers lost in the first round. Auburn played in three consecutive National Championship games from 1988 to 1990 and won the WNIT in 2003. When Coach Joe Ciampi retired at the end of the 2003–2004 season, Auburn hired former Purdue and U.S. National and Olympic team head coach, Nell Fortner. Standout former Auburn players include: Ruthie Bolton, Vickie Orr, Carolyn Jones, Chantel Tremitiere, Lauretta Freeman, Monique Morehouse, and DeWanna Bonner.

Baseball

Auburn Baseball has won six SEC championships, three SEC Tournament championships, appeared in sixteen NCAA Regionals and reached the College World Series (CWS) four times. After a disappointing 2003–2004 season, former Auburn assistant coach Tom Slater was named head coach. He was replaced in 2008 by John Pawlowski. Samford Stadium-Hitchcock Field at Plainsman Park is considered one of the finest facilities in college baseball and has a seating capacity of 4,096, not including lawn areas. In addition to Bo Jackson, Auburn has supplied several other players to Major League Baseball, including Frank Thomas, Gregg Olson, Scott Sullivan, Tim Hudson, Mark Bellhorn, Jack Baker, Terry Leach, Josh Hancock, Gabe Gross, Steven Register, Trey Wingenter, David Ross and Josh Donaldson.

Women's golf
Auburn's Women's Golf team has risen to be extremely competitive in the NCAA in recent years. Since 1999, they hold an 854–167–13 (.826 win percentage) record. The team has been in five NCAA finals and finished second in 2002 and then third in 2005. The program has a total of seven SEC Championships (1989, 1996, 2000, 2003, 2005, 2006, and 2009). The seven titles is third all time for Women's golf. In October 2005, Auburn was named the #3 team nationally out of 229 total teams since 1999 by GolfWeek magazine. Auburn's highest finish in the NCAA tournament was a tie for 2nd in 2002.

Since 1996, the team has been headed by Coach Kim Evans, a 1981 alumna, who has turned the program into one of the most competitive in the nation. Coach Evans has helped develop All-Americans, SEC Players of the Year as well as three SEC Freshman of the Year. She has led the Tigers to eight-straight NCAA appearances. She is by far the winningest Coach in Auburn Golf History, having over 1100 wins and winning six of Auburn's seven total SEC Titles. Evans was named National Coach of the Year in 2003 and has coached 8 individual All-Americans while at Auburn.

Track and field
The Auburn women's track and field team won its first national title in 2006 at the NCAA Outdoor Track and Field Championships, scoring 57 points to win over the University of Southern California, which finished second with 38.5 points. Auburn posted All-American performances in nine events, including two individual national champions and three second-place finishers, and broke two school records during the four-day event.

Auburn's men's team finished second at the 2003 NCAA Outdoor Championships and at the 1978, 1997 and 2003 NCAA Indoor Championships. The women's team finished 14th (2002, 2003) at the Outdoor Championships and seventh (2003) at the Indoor Championships.

Equestrian
Auburn's equestrian team captured the 2006 national championship, the first equestrian national championship in school history. Senior Kelly Gottfried and junior Whitney Kimble posted team-high scores in their respective divisions as the Auburn equestrian team clinched the overall national championship at the 2006 Varsity Equestrian Championships at the EXPO/New Mexico State Fairgrounds in Albuquerque, New Mexico.  In 2008, the Auburn equestrian team captured the 2008 Hunt Seat National Championship. Over fences riders finished 12–1–1 overall for the week. Auburn has also consistently been highly ranked in the Women's Intercollegiate Equestrian National Coaches Poll as well. The Auburn equestrian team most recently captured the 2019 national championship.

Notable club sports

Wrestling 
At the conclusion of the 1980-1981 NCAA Wrestling season, Auburn University became the first SEC team to place Top 10 in the country. Coached by Ohio wrestling legend Tom Milkovich, Auburn claimed the SEC title en route to a historic season boasting three All-Americans and 6 NCAA qualifiers. However, with the emergence of Title IX and the decline of wrestling in the SEC, Auburn found itself without a varsity program after the 1980-81 season. Since 1997 Auburn has competed in the National Collegiate Wrestling Association (NCWA) as the Auburn University Wrestling Club, placing 24 All-Americans, a National Champion, and six Top-10 finishes at the Division 1 National Championships. Auburn, headed by President Justin King, looks to further this success in its 26th year of membership in the NCWA.

Rugby 
The Auburn University Rugby Football Club was founded in 1973. Auburn plays Division 1 college rugby in the Southeastern Collegiate Rugby Conference against traditional SEC rivals such as Alabama and Georgia. Auburn rugby is one of only two club sports at Auburn with an endowment fund, resulting in the university allocating additional resources to rugby.

Traditions

Auburn University has many traditions including a creed, an alma mater, a fight song, a battle cry, a mascot and several notable game-day traditions including an eagle flying over the football field.

Colors 
The official colors are:

Fight song
Auburn University's fight song, "War Eagle", was written in 1954 and 1955 by Robert Allen and Al Stillman. It was introduced at the beginning of the 1955 football season and served as the official fight song since.

Auburn's Eagles

Auburn has currently two eagles in their flight program for educational initiatives. One of these educational programs is known as the pregame flight program where the eagle handlers set an eagle free before Auburn takes the field at Jordan–Hare Stadium. The eagle then proceeds to fly around the stadium and eventually land in the middle of the field. Auburn has two different species of eagle that have flown: the golden eagle and the bald eagle.

Spirit is the only bald eagle Auburn has used for its pregame flight program. His first flight was in 2000. Spirit was found as a baby with an injured beak and nursed back to health before being given to Auburn for further rehabilitation in 1998. Unfortunately, Spirit's beak was damaged to the point that it is impossible for his release back into the wild.

Tiger, also known as War Eagle VI, was born in 1980 in captivity and given to Auburn University in 1986. Tiger's first flight before an Auburn football game came against Wyoming in 2000. She retired after the Georgia game in 2006. Throughout Tiger's career, she flew many different flights and at many different venues including the 2002 Winter Olympics. Tiger died at the age of 34 in 2014.

Auburn's first Flight program eagle until 2019 was Nova, War Eagle VII. His first flight came before Auburn's game against Kentucky in 2004. He was born at the Montgomery zoo and given to Auburn a year later.

Aubie the Tiger
Auburn's mascot, Aubie the tiger, has been around since 1959. He made his first appearance that year on the October 3 gameday football program versus Hardin-Simmons College. Aubie was the creation of Birmingham Post-Herald artist Phil Neel and was the focal point of Auburn's football programs for 18 years. Auburn Football experienced good luck while Aubie remained on the cover, ending with a 23–2–1 home record and 63–16–2 overall record while he was on the program cover. Aubie the tiger is still currently Auburn's official mascot and has won the most National Mascot titles in the contest's history, with ten.

War Eagle chant theories
During Auburn's game against Georgia in 1892, a civil war veteran in the stands brought his pet eagle that he found on a battleground during the war. The eagle during the game flew away from the soldier and began circling the field in the air. As all this went on, Auburn began marching down the field to eventually score the game-winning touchdown. At the end of the game, the eagle dove into the ground and subsequently died; however, the Auburn faithful took the eagle as an omen of success and coined the phrase "War Eagle" in turn.

During a pep rally in 1913, a cheerleader said that the team would have to fight the whole game because the game meant "war". At the same time of the rally, an eagle emblem fell on a student's military hat. When asked what it was, he yelled it was a "War Eagle".

During a game against the Carlisle Indian Team in 1914, Auburn attempted to single out Carlisle's toughest player, Bald Eagle. To tire him out, they began running the ball his way during every play, by saying "bald eagle", while in formation. The crowd mistook this and began yelling "War Eagle", instead, leading to Auburn's player, Lucy Hairston, to yell "War Eagle" at the end of the game, after he scored the game-winning touchdown.

After a battle, the Saxon warriors would yell "War Eagle", when the buzzards started to circle the battlefields. Some believe that Auburn coined its battle cry from this practice by the Saxons.

Toomer's Corner
The tradition of rolling Toomer's Corner on Auburn's campus after winning home and big away games is thought to have originated in the 1950s. The tradition is thought to have spawned from when the owner of Toomer's Drugs, Sheldon Toomer, would toss his receipt paper into the trees to signal an Auburn road victory. This iconic tradition was ranked by USA Today as the "Best Sports Tradition". In November 2010, following Auburn's victory over the University of Alabama in the Iron Bowl, an Alabama supporter poisoned the large live oak trees at Toomer's Corner using the herbicide Spike 80DF (tebuthiuron). The 83-85-year-old trees did not survive, and in the years since have been replaced several times (once following a fire in 2016) with the most recent replacements being planted in 2017.

Selected organizations

Media and publications
 The Auburn Plainsman – the university's student-run newspaper, has won 23 National Pacemaker Awards from the Associated Collegiate Press since 1966. Only the University of Texas' student paper has won more.
 WEGL 91.1 FM – The Auburn campus radio station which is open to students of all majors as well as faculty and staff who wish to DJ.
 Eagle Eye TV – Auburn University's on-campus news station that is run by students and that airs on-campus, off-campus, and on-demand via eagleeyeauburn.com.
 The Auburn Circle – The student general-interest magazine. The Circle publishes poetry, art, photography, fiction, nonfiction, and architectural and industrial design from Auburn students, faculty, staff, and alumni.
 The Glomerata – Auburn University's student-run yearbook which began production in 1897. Its name is derived from the conglomeration of Auburn.
 Southern Humanities Review – One of the leading literary journals in the region, The Southern Humanities Review has been published at the university by members of the English faculty, graduate students in English, and the Southern Humanities Council since 1967, publishing the work of nationally known authors such as Kent Nelson and R. T. Smith.
 Encyclopedia of Alabama – Auburn hosts the encyclopedia's editorial offices and servers and the Alabama Humanities Foundation holds copyright to the encyclopedia's original content.
 Auburn University Office of Communications and Marketing – Auburn University's news outlet for media related to the accomplishments of university faculty, staff and students.
 Auburn University's official YouTube channel – Auburn University's YouTube channel was announced on January 15, 2008. It contains a wide variety of videos, from promotional to educational. AU's Office of Communications and Marketing manages the content on the university's YouTube Channel.

Notable alumni and faculty members

Alumni 
Auburn has a diverse group of alumni, in many different industries.  Some of its prominent alumni include Apple CEO Tim Cook, MacArthur Genius and 2004 AIA Gold Medal recipient Samuel Mockbee, National Security Agency and Commander of the U.S. Cyber Command Michael S. Rogers, Academy Award winner Octavia Spencer, Wikipedia co-founder Jimmy Wales, NBA star Charles Barkley, NFL quarterback Cam Newton, NFL star and MLB player Bo Jackson, Alabama governor Kay Ivey, Tennessee governor Bill Lee, NASA astronauts Ken Mattingly, Jim Voss and Jan Davis, bestselling author James Redfield, Secretary of Defense Lloyd Austin, and world-renowned modernist architect Paul Rudolph.

See also

 Auburn University Chapel
 Donald E. Davis Arboretum
 Luther Duncan
 List of forestry universities and colleges

Notes

References

External links

 
 Auburn Athletics website
 
 

 
1856 establishments in Alabama
Alabama Cooperative Extension System
Buildings and structures in Auburn, Alabama
Education in Lee County, Alabama
Educational institutions established in 1856
Landmarks in Alabama
Universities and colleges accredited by the Southern Association of Colleges and Schools
Public universities and colleges in Alabama